Semecarpus ochraceus is a species of plant in the family Anacardiaceae. It is endemic to Sri Lanka. The specific epithet has also been spelt ochracea.

References

Endemic flora of Sri Lanka
ochraceus
Critically endangered plants
Taxonomy articles created by Polbot